Isabella of Portugal (1364–1395) was the natural daughter of King Ferdinand I of Portugal, from an unknown mother.

Biography 
Before 1386 she was betrothed to João Afonso Telo de Menezes, 1st Count of Viana (do Alentejo), son of the powerful João Afonso Telo, 4th Count of Barcelos. However, this project was abandoned or dissolved.

She married Alfonso Enríquez, Count of Gijón and Noreña, natural son of King Henry II of Castile. Her marriage was one of the clauses of the Treaty of Santarém, signed in 1373, between Portugal and Castile.

Through a royal letter issued on 1 October 1377, her father granted her the Lordship of Viseu, Celorico, Linhares and Algodres.

She left to the Royal Court of King Henry II of Castile where she lived while waiting for an appropriate age to get married. They finally married in 1377 in the city of Burgos. This marriage gave rise to the Noronha family, still represented in several aristocratic houses, both in Portugal and in Spain.

The couple had six children:
 Pedro de Noronha (137920 August 1452), Archbishop of Lisbon (14241452), father of João, Pedro and Fernando de Noronha;
 Fernando de Noronha, second count of Vila Real by his marriage to Beatrice de Meneses, second countess of Vila Real, daughter and heiress of Pedro de Menezes; 
Sancho de Noronha, first Count of Odemira, comendador mayor of the Order of Santiago, alcalde-mor of Estremoz and Elvas, Lord of Vimieiro, Mortágua, Aveiro and other territories, married to Mécia de Sousa; 
 Henrique de Noronha, captain in Ceuta, without legitimate male issue; 
 João de Noronha, participated in the siege of Balaguer and was knighted by Infante Duarte in the siege of Ceuta where he was injured. He died from his wounds shortly afterwards without having left any offspring. 
 Constance of Noronha, the second wife of Afonso, Duke of Braganza, without issue.

Isabella eventually returned to her native Portugal where her uncle, King John I of Portugal, gave her a warm welcome and protection, both to her and to her children.

See also 
 Noronha
 Noreña

References

Bibliography 

 
 
 "Nobreza de Portugal e Brasil" – Vol. II, pages 234/235. Published by Zairol Lda., Lisbon 1989.

Medieval Portuguese nobility
1364 births
1395 deaths
House of Burgundy-Portugal
14th-century Portuguese people
14th-century Portuguese women
Daughters of kings